Margaret "Meg" Ann Twycross  is a literary scholar and historian specialising in medieval theatre and iconography. She is Emeritus Professor at Lancaster University.

Career
After a Quaker childhood spent in Lancashire, Trinidad, and Barking (Essex), Twycross went to Somerville College, Oxford. After time spent living in Chile and the Arabian Gulf, she returned to Oxford as college lecturer at both Worcester College and St Edmund Hall before, in 1974, moving to Lancaster University where she has been for the rest of her academic career.

She is particularly interested in the practicalities of medieval staging, and the way in which what the audience sees contributes to the message of the plays. Performance research from 1969 onward has seen her productions in original venues, from the streets of York and Chester to Great Halls in colleges and country houses. She is Executive Editor of the journal Medieval English Theatre.

Her 2002 book with Sarah Carpenter Masks and Masking in Medieval and Early Tudor England won the 2004 Bevington Award for Best New Book from the Medieval and Renaissance Drama Society. An early interest in humanities computing and the presentation of material on screen was reflected in her teaching and the construction of websites, which include The Journeys of George Fox 1652-1653. She was elected as a Fellow of the Society of Antiquaries of London on 11 November 2014.

Select publications

References

Living people
Women historians
20th-century English historians
21st-century English historians
Fellows of the Society of Antiquaries of London
Medievalists
Academics of Lancaster University
Year of birth missing (living people)
Alumni of Somerville College, Oxford